Manglares Churute Ecological Reserve is located in the Guayas Province of Ecuador.

Fauna
The many lakes located in the park are great ways to view many aquatic birds and tortoises. Ducks, herons, woodpeckers, badgers, anteaters, shrimp and crabs inhabit the inlets in the lakes.

Flora
Near the water are many mangrove formations. Oak, ebony, silk-cotton trees and balsa are some trees found in the dry forests. Around most of the park orchids and bromeliads cover the landscape.

Attractions
Canoe trips through mangrove areas allow the viewing of many unique species of Fauna. 
HIking is also an option here.

See also

List of national parks in Ecuador

Nature reserves in Ecuador
Geography of Guayas Province
Tourist attractions in Guayas Province
Educational institutions established in 1979
1979 establishments in Ecuador